Arnold Henry Savage Landor (2 June 1865 – 26 December 1924) was an English painter, explorer, writer, and anthropologist.  Landor wrote in an often witty style.

Life and career

Arnold H. S. Landor was born to Charles Savage Landor in Florence, Italy, where he spent his childhood. The writer Walter Savage Landor was his grandfather.

He left for Paris at age fifteen to study at the Académie Julian directed by Gustave Boulanger and Jules Lefebvre. He then traveled the world, including America, Japan, and Korea, painting many landscapes and portraits. Upon his return to England, he was invited to Balmoral by Queen Victoria to recount his adventures and show his drawings. He later traveled to Nepal and Tibet, telling of his experiences in two books: In the Forbidden Land (1898) and Tibet and Nepal (1905).

When he learned about the Boxer Rebellion in China he went to Peking (now spelled Beijing) to join the victory parade, afterward writing China and the Allies (1901). In 1901 he traveled from Russia to India, riding on horseback through Persia, publishing the account of that journey in the book Across Coveted Lands (1902).  A journey to the Philippine Islands resulted in another book: The Gems of the East (1904).

During the 1900s he visited Abyssinia and painted a portrait of the king Menelik II. Landor's book Across Widest Africa was published in 1906. During 1911 and 1912 he made an eventful expedition to the Mato Grosso in Brazil and in 1913 published Across Unknown South America.

He had an active role in World War I, designing tanks and airships.  Eventually, he retired to write his autobiography in Florence, where he died in 1924.

He is buried in the English Cemetery, Florence.

Works
 Alone with the Hairy Ainu (1893).
 Corea or Cho-sen (1895).
 In the Forbidden Land (1898).
 China and the Allies (1901).
 Across Coveted Lands (1902). VOL I. VOL II. 
 The Gems of the East (1904).
 Tibet and Nepal (1905).
 The Living Races of Mankind (1905).
 Across Widest Africa (1907).
 An Explorer's Adventures in Tibet (1910).
 Across Unknown South America (1913).
 Everywhere, the Memoirs of an Explorer (1924).

References

External links

 
 

1865 births
1924 deaths
English travel writers
English male painters
English explorers
English anthropologists
19th-century English painters
20th-century English painters
19th-century English male artists
20th-century English male artists